Alan Barnett(e) may refer to:

 Alan Barnett (footballer) (1934–1978), English former professional football goalkeeper
 Alan Barnett (motorcyclist), English former Grand Prix motorcycle road racer
Alan Barnette from Off Limits (1988 film)